Jean Beard is an American educator currently Professor Emerita, focused in evolution education and education about the nature of science, at Indiana University and an Elected Fellow of the American Association for the Advancement of Science.

References

Fellows of the American Association for the Advancement of Science
University of Iowa alumni
Oregon State University alumni
Year of birth missing (living people)
Living people
Indiana University faculty
Place of birth missing (living people)